Christian G. Wolff (born March 8, 1934) is an American composer of experimental classical music and classicist.

Biography
Wolff was born in Nice, France, to the German literary publishers Helen and Kurt Wolff, who had published works by Franz Kafka, Robert Musil, and Walter Benjamin. After relocating to the U.S. in 1941, they helped to found Pantheon Books with other European intellectuals who had fled Europe during the rise of fascism. The Wolffs published a series of notable English translations of European literature, mostly, as well as an edition of the I Ching that came to greatly impress John Cage after Wolff had given him a copy.

Wolff became an American citizen in 1946. When he was sixteen (in 1950) his piano teacher Grete Sultan sent him for lessons in composition to the new music composer John Cage. Wolff soon became a close associate of Cage and his artistic circle  which was part of the New York School and included the fellow composers Earle Brown and Morton Feldman, the pianist David Tudor, and the dancer and choreographer Merce Cunningham. Cage relates several anecdotes about Wolff in his one-minute Indeterminacy pieces.

Almost completely self-taught as composer, Wolff studied music under Sultan and Cage. Later Wolff studied classics at Harvard University (BA, PhD) and became an expert on Euripides. Wolff taught Classics at Harvard until 1970; thereafter he taught classics, comparative literature, and music at Dartmouth College. After nine years, he became Strauss Professor of Music there. He retired from teaching at Dartmouth in 1999. In 2004, he received an honorary degree from the California Institute of the Arts. He was also awarded the Foundation for Contemporary Arts John Cage Award (1996).

Wolff is married and has four children.

Music
Wolff's early compositional work included a lot of silence and was based initially on complicated rhythmic schema, and later on a system of aural cues. He innovated unique notational methods in his early scores and found creative ways of dealing with improvisation in his music. During the 1960s he developed associations with the composers Frederic Rzewski and Cornelius Cardew who spurred each other on in their respective explorations of experimental composition techniques and musical improvisation, and then, from the early 1970s, in their attempts to engage with political matters in their music. For Wolff this often involved the use of music and texts associated with protest and political movements such as the Wobblies. His later pieces, such as the sequence of pieces Exercises (1973-), offer some freedom to the performers. Some works, such as Changing the System (1973), Braverman Music (1978, after Harry Braverman), and the series of pieces Peace March (1983–2005) have an explicit political dimension, in that they respond to contemporary world events and express political ideals.

Wolff collaborated with Merce Cunningham for many years and developed a style which is more common now, but was revolutionary when they began working together in the 1950s – a style where music and dance occur simultaneously, yet somewhat independently of one another. Wolff stated, of any influence or affect, the greatest influence on his music over the years was the choreography of Cunningham.  Wolff recently said of his work that it is motivated by his desire "to turn the making of music into a collaborative and transforming activity (performer into composer into listener into composer into performer, etc.), the cooperative character of the activity to the exact source of the music. To stir up, through the production of the music, a sense of social conditions in which we live and of how these might be changed."

Wolff's music reached a new audience when Sonic Youth's SYR4: Goodbye, 20th Century featured works by avant-garde classical composers such as John Cage, Yoko Ono, Steve Reich, and Christian Wolff played by Sonic Youth along with several collaborators from the modern avant-garde music scene, such as Christian Marclay, William Winant, Wharton Tiers, Takehisa Kosugi and others, as well as Wolff himself.

Major works 
Duo for Violins (1950)
For Prepared Piano (1951)
Duo for Pianists I (1957)
For Piano With Preparations (1957)
For Pianist (1959)
Summer (for string quartet) (1961)
For 1, 2, or 3 People (1964)
Edges (1968)
Pairs (1968)
Prose Collection (1968–71)
Tilbury 1, 2, and 3 (for piano) (1969)
Snowdrop (for trombone, violin, and piano) (1970)
Burdocks (1970–71)
Exercises (1973- )
Wobbly Music (1975–76)
I Like to Think of Harriet Tubman (1985)
Piano Trio (Greenham-Seneca-Camiso) (1985) Greenham Common Women's Peace Camp The Seneca Women's Encampment for a Future of Peace and Justice
Piano Miscellany (1988) 
Percussionist Songs (1994–95)
Spring (for chamber orchestra) (1995)
Berlin Exercises (2000)
Ordinary Matter (2001–04)
John Heartfield (Peace March 10) (2002)
Long Piano (Peace March 11) (2004-05)Microexercises (2006)Winter Exercise (2013)Trio IX – Accanto (2017)Resistance (2017)Mountain Messengers (2020)

 References 

 Further reading 
(1998) Wolff, Christian, Cues: Writings & Conversations/Hinweise: Schriften und Gespräche, Köln: Musiktexte (eds.) G. Gronemeyer & R. Oehlschagel.
(2001) Robert Carl, Christian Wolff: On tunes, politics, and mystery, in Contemporary Music Review. Issue 4, pp. 61–69.

(2004) Stephen Chase & Clemens Gresser, 'Ordinary Matters: Christian Wolff on his Recent Music', in Tempo 58/229 (July), pp. 19–27.
(2006) Rzewski, Frederic "The Algebra of Everyday Life". Liner note essay on Christian Wolff. New World Records.
(2009)  Steenhuisen, Paul.  "Interview with Christian Wolff".  In Sonic Mosaics: Conversations with Composers.  Edmonton:  University of Alberta Press, 2009.  
 (2009) Tilbury, John "Christian Wolff and the Politics of Music". Liner note essay. New World Records.
 (2010) Chase, Stephen & Thomas, Philip (editors), "Changing the System: the Music of Christian Wolff" Ashgate, 2010
 (2012) Bredow, Moritz von, "Rebellische Pianistin. Das Leben der Grete Sultan zwischen Berlin und New York." (Biography). Schott Music, Mainz, Germany.  (Detailed account of the life of pianist Grete Sultan, Christian Wolff's piano teacher who eventually acquainted him with Cage. Contains many references to the New York Avant-garde).
 (2017) Wolff, Christian, Occasional Pieces – Writings and Interviews, 1952–2013, New York: Oxford University Press
 (2018) Jim Igor Kallenberg, "Intergalactic mutant music: The music of Christian Wolff and the politics of 1968. Christian Wolff in conversation with Jim Igor Kallenberg", Wien Modern 31: Sicherheit. 28.10.-30.11.2018. Essays (Festivalkatalog Band 2), pp. 90–95.
 (2020) Zimmerman, Walter, Desert Plants – Conversations with 23 American Musicians'', Berlin: Beginner Press in cooperation with Mode Records (originally published in 1976 by A.R.C., Vancouver). The 2020 edition includes a cd featuring the original interview recordings with Larry Austin, Robert Ashley, Jim Burton, John Cage, Philip Corner, Morton Feldman, Philip Glass, Joan La Barbara, Garrett List, Alvin Lucier, John McGuire, Charles Morrow, J.B. Floyd (on Conlon Nancarrow), Pauline Oliveros, Charlemagne Palestine, Ben Johnston (on Harry Partch), Steve Reich, David Rosenboom, Frederic Rzewski, Richard Teitelbaum, James Tenney, Christian Wolff, and La Monte Young.

External links 

 Art of the States: Christian Wolff
 Works
 Interview
 Two pieces
 Improvisations with Kui Dong and Larry Polansky
 19 interpretations of the piece "Stones" (1968)
Christian Wolff papers, 1947-2017 Music Division, New York Public Library for the Performing Arts

1934 births
Living people
20th-century classical composers
21st-century classical composers
American male classical composers
American classical composers
French emigrants to the United States
Harvard College alumni
French people of German descent
American people of German descent
Dartmouth College faculty
Experimental composers
Tzadik Records artists
21st-century American composers
20th-century American composers
20th-century American male musicians
21st-century American male musicians
Harvard Graduate School of Arts and Sciences alumni